Salvatore Raiti (11 January 1965) is an Italian politician.

Born in Catania, he was elected to the Chamber of Deputies in the 2006 Italian general election while affiliated with the Italy of Values party. In the midst of his single parliamentary term, Raiti joined the Democratic Party in September 2007.

References

1965 births
20th-century Italian politicians
Deputies of Legislature XV of Italy
20th-century Italian lawyers
Politicians from Catania
Italy of Values politicians
Democratic Party (Italy) politicians
Living people